Louisiana State University School of Dentistry is a school of dentistry located in the United States city of New Orleans.

History 
Louisiana State University School of Dentistry is part of the Louisiana State University System. The school was established in 1968.

Academics 
Louisiana State University School of Dentistry awards following degrees:
Doctorate of Dental Surgery

Departments 
Louisiana State University School of Dentistry includes the following departments:
Department of Comprehensive Dentistry & Biomaterials
Department of Dental Health Resources
Department of Dental Hygiene
Department of Endodontics
Department of Oral & Craniofacial Biology
Department of Oral & Maxillofacial Pathology
Department of Oral & Maxillofacial Surgery
Department of Oral Medicine and Radiology
Department of Orthodontics
Department of Pediatric Dentistry
Department of Periodontics
Department of Prosthodontics

Accreditation 
Louisiana State University School of Dentistry is currently accredited by ADA.

References 

Louisiana State University System
Dental schools in Louisiana